Morinia is a genus of flies in the family Polleniidae.

Species
Morinia argenticincta (Senior-White, 1923)
Morinia carinata (Pape, 1987)
Morinia doronici (Scopoli, 1763)
Morinia crassitarsis (Villeneuve, 1936)
Morinia lactineala (Pape, 1997)
Morinia longirostris (Crosskey, 1977)
Morinia nigerrima (Herting, 1961)
Morinia piliparafacia Fan, 1997
Morinia proceripenisa Feng, 2004
Morinia royi (Pape, 1997)
Morinia skufyini Khitsova, 1983
Morinia stuckenbergi (Crosskey, 1977)
Morinia tsitsikamma Cerretti, Stireman, Badano, Gisondi, Rognes, Lo Giudice & Pape, 2019

References

Polleniidae
Brachycera genera
Diptera of Africa
Diptera of Europe
Diptera of Asia
Taxa named by Jean-Baptiste Robineau-Desvoidy